Blepephaeus succinctor is a species of beetle in the family Cerambycidae. It was described by Chevrolat in 1852, originally under the genus Monohammus. It is known from Malaysia, India, Sumatra, Myanmar, Taiwan, China, Thailand, and Vietnam. It feeds on Acacia confusa, Albizia chinensis, Firmiana simplex, Melia azedarach, Morus alba, and Vernicia fordii.

Subspecies
 Blepephaeus succinctor succinctor (Chevrolat, 1852)
 Blepephaeus succinctor sumatrensis Breuning, 1965

References

Blepephaeus
Beetles described in 1852